Usman Liaqat (born 2 May 1992) is a Pakistani cricketer. He made his first-class debut for Multan in the 2012–13 Quaid-e-Azam Trophy on 28 December 2012.

References

External links
 

1992 births
Living people
Pakistani cricketers
Multan cricketers
Place of birth missing (living people)